Pike Run is a stream in the U.S. state of Pennsylvania. It is a tributary to the Juniata River.

Pike Run was so named on account of its stock of pike fish.

References

Rivers of Pennsylvania
Rivers of Huntingdon County, Pennsylvania